Ricafort is a surname. Notable people with the surname include:

Catherine Ricafort, American actress and singer
Mariano Ricafort Palacín y Abarca (1776–1846), Governor of Cuba